DCITA may refer to:
Defense Cyber Investigations Training Academy
Department of Communications, Information Technology and the Arts